MGTA may refer to:
La mission des grands travaux aéronautiques en Allemagne, French government unit (1951–1991)
MgtA, a Magnesium transporter protein
MG TA, a car